Henry Cushing Grover (April 1, 1927 – November 28, 2005), usually known as Hank Grover, was an American politician from the U.S. state of Texas best known for his relatively narrow defeat in 1972.

Election history

Most recent election

1996

1972

See also

 List of American politicians who switched parties in office

References

External links
 Grover's eulogy introduced into the Congressional Record by Ralph Hall
http://www.baylor.edu/Lariat/news.php?action=story&story=9223
http://www.tshaonline.org/handbook/online/articles/mqs01
https://web.archive.org/web/20140109062336/http://elections.sos.state.tx.us/elchist.exe
http://www.chron.com/content/chronicle/metropolitan/95/12/06/lbj.html
http://www.chron.com/content/chronicle/aol-metropolitan/96/01/18/notebook.html

Sources
Congressional Quarterly's Guide to U.S. Elections
http://www.legacy.com/NYTIMES/DeathNotices.asp?Page=LifeStory&PersonId=16149533

1927 births
2005 deaths
20th-century American educators
Members of the Texas House of Representatives
Texas state senators
Politicians from Houston
People from Corpus Christi, Texas
Politicians from San Antonio
Texas Republicans
Texas Democrats
University of Houston alumni
Neurological disease deaths in Texas
Deaths from Alzheimer's disease
University of St. Thomas (Texas) alumni
St. Thomas High School (Houston, Texas) alumni
20th-century American politicians
Catholics from Texas
Educators from Texas
Conservatism in the United States